Cristhian Pascual Adames Mejia (born July 26, 1991) is a Dominican professional baseball infielder for the Leones de Yucatán of the Mexican League.

The Colorado Rockies signed Adames as a non-drafted free agent in 2007. He has played in Major League Baseball (MLB) for the Rockies, with whom he made his MLB debut in 2014, and San Francisco Giants.

Career

Colorado Rockies
The Rockies signed Adames as a non-drafted free agent in 2007. He made his MLB debut with the Rockies on July 29, 2014. The Rockies designated Adames for assignment on April 30, 2017. He elected free agency on November 6, 2017.

Miami Marlins
On December 14, 2017 he signed a minor league contract with the Miami Marlins. He elected free agency on November 2, 2018.

Chicago Cubs
On January 21, 2019, Adames signed a minor league contract with the Chicago Cubs. He was released on July 5, 2019.

San Francisco Giants
On July 12, 2019, Adames signed a minor league deal with the San Francisco Giants. On September 14, the Giants selected his contract. He batted .318/.375/.364 for the Giants in 22 at bats. Playing for the Sacramento River Cats, he hit .283/.364/.517 in 145 at bats. Adames was outrighted off the Giants roster on November 1. He became a free agent on November 2, 2020.

Leones de Yucatán
On March 21, 2022, Adames signed with the Saraperos de Saltillo of the Mexican League for the 2022 season. However, he did not make the Opening Day roster and his rights were later acquired by the Leones de Yucatán. He signed with the Leones on April 23, 2022.

References

External links

1991 births
Living people
Albuquerque Isotopes players
Arizona League Cubs players
Asheville Tourists players
Casper Ghosts players
Colorado Springs Sky Sox players
Colorado Rockies players
Dominican Republic expatriate baseball players in Mexico
Dominican Republic expatriate baseball players in the United States
Dominican Summer League Rockies players
Iowa Cubs players
Leones de Yucatán players
Major League Baseball players from the Dominican Republic
Major League Baseball shortstops
New Orleans Baby Cakes players
Modesto Nuts players
Sacramento River Cats players
Salt River Rafters players
San Francisco Giants players
Sportspeople from Santo Domingo
Toros del Este players
Tulsa Drillers players